The United States sent a delegation to compete at the 2010 Winter Paralympics in Vancouver, British Columbia, Canada.  A total of 50 U.S. competitors took part in all five sports.  The American delegation included five former members of the U.S. military, including a veteran of the Iraq War (Heath Calhoun) and a veteran of the War in Afghanistan (Andy Soule).

The United States finished sixth in the gold medal and fifth in the total medal count.  U.S. coverage of the 2010 Paralympic Games was provided primarily by the Universal Sports Television Network.

Disability classifications
Every participant at the Paralympics had their disability grouped into one of five disability categories; amputation, the condition may be congenital or sustained through injury or illness; cerebral palsy; wheelchair athletes, there is often overlap between this and other categories; visual impairment, including blindness; Les autres, any physical disability that does not fall strictly under one of the other categories, for example dwarfism or multiple sclerosis. Each Paralympic sport then had its own classifications, dependent upon the specific physical demands of competition. Events were given a code, made of numbers and letters, describing the type of event and classification of the athletes competing. Events with "B" in the code were for athletes with visual impairment, codes LW1 to LW9 were for athletes who stood to compete, and LW10 to LW12 were for athletes who competed sitting down. In biathlon events, which contained a target shooting component, blind and visually impaired athletes were able to compete through the use of acoustic signals, whose signal intensity varied dependent upon whether or not the athlete was on target.

Medalists

The following American athletes won medals at the games; all dates are for March 2010.  In the 'by discipline' sections below, medalists' names are in bold.

| width="78%" align="left" valign="top" |

| width="22%" align="left" valign="top" |

Alpine skiing 

On February 26, 2010, U.S. Paralympics nominated a team of 14 men and 10 women (plus three guides) to compete in alpine skiing.

Men

Women

Biathlon 

Two U.S. competitors participated in the biathlon. Both are also members of the U.S. cross-country skiing team.  Andy Soule, a veteran of the War in Afghanistan, won the bronze medal in men's 2.4 km sitting pursuit on the opening day of the Paralympics, becoming the first American to win a biathlon medal in the either the Olympic or the Paralympic Winter Games.

Cross-country skiing 

The cross-country skiing team consists of four men and two women. Two of the skiers, Andy Soule and Kelly Underkofler, will also be competing in the biathlon.

Calculated time
To ensure a fair event when athletes with differing disabilities compete, times achieved were sometimes modified by a percentage rate, to produce a result known as "Calculated Time". It is this time that decided the result of the races, and is listed below. Where this differs from the real time recorded, real time is also listed.

 Men

 Women

Key
RT = real time
CT = calculated time

Ice sledge hockey 

The U.S. qualified for sledge hockey (also known as sled hockey) at the 2010 Paralympics by winning the 2009 IPC Ice Sledge Hockey World Championships. USA Hockey nominated the 15-member sledge hockey team on December 15, 2009 pending approval by the United States Olympic Committee.  With a win over Japan in the gold medal game on March 20, 2010, the U.S. captured its second-ever gold medal in the sport. The team did not allow a goal in the tournament, outscoring its opponents by a total of 19 to 0.  Alexi Salamone, born with deformed legs due to the Chernobyl nuclear disaster and later adopted by an American family, was the leading scorer for the U.S. with four goals and eight points in five games.

Wheelchair curling 

The U.S. team qualified for the 2010 Paralympic wheelchair curling tournament based on their performance in the 2007, 2008, and 2009 World Wheelchair Curling Championships. After two straight losses in the playoff round, the team finished in fourth place.

Team
The team is as follows:

Skip: Augusto Perez
Third: Patrick McDonald
Second: James Pierce 
Lead: Jacqui Kapinowski
Alternate: James Joseph
Coach: Steve Brown

Standings

Round robin results
The United States finished with a 7–2 win–loss record, in second place.

Semifinals

Bronze medal game

Media coverage
U.S. coverage of the 2010 Paralympic Games was provided primarily by the Universal Sports Television Network.  A nightly two-hour show covering daily competition was broadcast from March 15–23, and on-demand replays were offered on UniversalSports.com.   Daily video highlights were also available at the official website of the U.S. Paralympic Team, usparalympics.org.  NBC showed a one-hour program covering the Opening Ceremony on March 13, and will show a two-hour highlights program on April 10.

See also
United States at the 2010 Winter Olympics

References

External links
Vancouver 2010 Paralympic Games official website
International Paralympic Committee official website
United States Paralympic Committee official website

Nations at the 2010 Winter Paralympics
2010
Paralympics